Abdur Rouf Chowdhury is a Bangladesh Nationalist Party politician, former Member of Parliament of Kushtia-2.

Career
Chowdhury was a veteran of Bangladesh Liberation War.

Chowdhury was elected to parliament from Kushtia-2 as a Bangladesh Awami League candidate in 1973. He was elected in 1991 as a Bangladesh Nationalist Party candidate from Kushtia-3.

Chowdhury refused to participate in the February 1996 election due to no party other than Bangladesh Nationalist Party contesting the election. The nomination went to Shahidul Islam.

His son, barrister Raghib Rauf Chowdhury, is the Office Secretary of the Lawyers unit of Bangladesh Nationalist Party.

References

Bangladesh Nationalist Party politicians
Living people
1st Jatiya Sangsad members
5th Jatiya Sangsad members
Year of birth missing (living people)
Mukti Bahini personnel